KAKJ (105.3 FM) is a radio station licensed to Marianna, Arkansas, United States. The station is owned by L.T. Simes II & Raymond Simes.

References

External links

AKJ
Urban adult contemporary radio stations in the United States